Lynn Gattis (born 1957 in Arcata, California) is an American politician. She served as Republican member of the Alaska House of Representatives from January 2013 to January 2017 representing Districts 9 and 7.

Education
Gattis attended the University of Alaska Anchorage.

Elections
2012 With Democratic Representative Scott Kawasaki redistricted to District 4, Gattis won the District 9 August 28, 2012 Republican Primary with 1,224 votes (61.35%), and won the November 6, 2012 General election with 4,759 votes (72.63%) against Democratic nominee Blake Merrifield.
2014 Gattis was unopposed in her primary, and won the general election against independent candidate Verne Rupright with 65% of the vote.
2016 With Charlie Huggins retiring from the state senate, Gattis ran for his seat and was defeated by Wasilla City Councilman Dave Wilson, 52-47%.

References

External links
 Official page at the Alaska Legislature
 Campaign site
 
 Lynn Gattis at 100 Years of Alaska's Legislature

21st-century American politicians
21st-century American women politicians
American aviation businesspeople
Businesspeople from Alaska
Living people
Republican Party members of the Alaska House of Representatives
People from Arcata, California
People from Wasilla, Alaska
School board members in Alaska
University of Alaska Anchorage alumni
Women state legislators in Alaska
1957 births